Paul Scanlan is an American businessman and the co-founder and CEO of Legion M, a fan-owned entertainment company. Scanlan is also the President and co-founder of MobiTV, an on-demand video streaming service for mobile devices.

Education and early career 
Scanlan graduated from the University of Wisconsin-Madison with a B.A. in communications. He began his career in sales at telecommunications firm Lucent Technologies, Inc. and later co-founded a boutique ad agency. Scanlan was also a managing partner at Enterprise IG (now Brand Union).

MobiTV 
Scanlan partnered with Phillip Alvelda and Jeff Annison to found MobiTV (originally known as Idetic) in 1999. In 2005, Scanlan and team were awarded an Engineering Emmy for bringing live broadcasts to cellphones. Forbes included Scanlan in a "Names You Need to Know" list in 2011, largely for creating the mobile video space with MobiTV and launching the first mobile television network with Sprint in 2003. Scanlan has also helped to raise more than $100 million in investment for the company.

His first role was VP of marketing, moving to the position of chief operating officer in 2005 and president in 2007. He has also been a member of the board since inception.

Legion M 
Scanlan, along with business partner and MobiTV co-founder Jeff Annison, founded Legion M in 2016, which purported to be the industry's first fan-owned media company. Legion M lets fans invest in and be part of the creation of the company's media content. , the company has raised $3 million in funding from more than 7,000 fan owners. It drives revenue through partnerships with creators, independent filmmakers, and established Hollywood studios.

Advisors of the company include Stoopid Buddy Stoodios, Tim League, Adam Rymer, Scott Landsman, and William Shatner.

References

Year of birth missing (living people)
Living people
American company founders